Verein für Leibesübungen Bochum 1848 Fußballgemeinschaft, commonly referred to as VfL Bochum or simply Bochum, is a German association football club based in the city of Bochum, North Rhine-Westphalia. The club has spent 35 seasons in the Bundesliga.

History

Founding to World War II
VfL Bochum is one of the oldest sports organizations in the world, claiming an origin date of 26 July 1848 when an article in the Märkischer Sprecher – a local newspaper – called for the creation of a gymnastics club. The Turnverein zu Bochum was then formally established on 18 February 1849. The club was banned on 28 December 1852 for political reasons and then reestablished on 19 June 1860. The club was reorganized in May 1904 as Turnverein zu Bochum, gegründet 1848 and formed a football department on 31 January 1911. On 1 April 1919, the club merged with Spiel und Sport 08 Bochum to form Turn- und Sportverein Bochum 1848. On 1 February 1924, the two clubs from the earlier merger split into the Bochumer Turnverein 1848 (gymnastics department) and Turn- und Sportverein Bochum 1908 (football, track and field, handball, hockey and tennis departments).

Bochumer Turnverein 1848 was forced by the Nazi regime to merge with Turn- und Sport Bochum 1908 and Sportverein Germania Vorwärts Bochum 1906 into the current-day club VfL Bochum on 14 April 1938. After the merger, VfL Bochum continued to compete in the top flight as part of the Gauliga Westfalen.

As World War II progressed, play throughout Germany became increasingly difficult due to player shortages, travel problems and damage to football fields from Allied bombing raids. VfL became part of the wartime side Kriegsspielgemeinschaft VfL 1848/Preußen Bochum alongside Preußen 07 Bochum before re-emerging as a separate side again after the war. Although they fielded competitive sides, they had the misfortune of playing in the same division as Schalke 04, which was the dominant team of the era. VfL's best result was therefore a distant second place in 1938–39.

Postwar and entry to Bundesliga play

Following World War II, the football section resumed play as the independent VfL Bochum 1848 and played its first season in the second division 2. Oberliga West in 1949, while Preußen Bochum went on to lower tier amateur level play. VfL captured the division title in 1953 to advance to the Oberliga West for a single season. They repeated their divisional win in 1956 and returned to the top-flight until again being relegated after the 1960–61 season.

With the formation of the Bundesliga, Germany's new professional league, in 1963 VfL found itself in the third tier Amateurliga Westfalen. A first-place result there in 1965 raised them to the Regionalliga West (II), from which they began a steady climb up the league table to the Bundesliga in 1971. During this rise, Bochum also played its way to the final of the 1967–68 DFB-Pokal, where they lost 1–4 to 1. FC Köln.

In spite of being a perennial lower table side, Bochum developed a reputation for tenaciousness on the field in a run of 20 seasons in the top flight. The club made a repeat appearance in the DFB-Pokal final in 1988, losing 0–1 to Eintracht Frankfurt. Relegated after a 16th-place finish in the 1992–93 season, the team has become a classic "yo-yo club", bouncing up and down between the Bundesliga and 2. Bundesliga. The club finished in 5th place in the Bundesliga in 1996–97 and 2003–04, which earned them appearances in the UEFA Cup. In 1997, they advanced to the third round, where they were eliminated by Ajax, and in 2004, they were eliminated early through away goals (0–0 and 1–1) by Standard Liège. 
In the 2020–21 season, the club won the 2. Bundesliga, earning promotion to the Bundesliga.

Current
Today's sports club has 5,000 members, with the football department accounting for over 2,200 of these. Other sections now part of the association include athletics, badminton, basketball, dance, fencing, gymnastics, handball, field hockey, swimming, table tennis, tennis, and volleyball.

Players

Current squad

Out on loan

Notable players

Honours
2. Bundesliga champions: 1993–94, 1995–96, 2005–06, 2020–21
DFB-Pokal finalists: 1967–68, 1987–88
Bundesliga UEFA Cup qualification: 1996–97 (5th), 2003–04 (5th)
Bundesliga top goal scorer: 1985–86 (Stefan Kuntz, 22 goals), 2002–03 (Thomas Christiansen, 21 goals (w/Giovane Élber)), 2006–07 (Theofanis Gekas, 20 goals)
Promoted to Bundesliga: 1970–71 (1st Regionalliga West, 1st promotion group #1), 1993–94 (1st), 1995–96 (1st), 1999–2000 (2nd), 2001–02 (3rd), 2005–06 (1st), 2020–21 (1st)
2. Bundesliga top goal scorer: 1993–94 (Uwe Wegmann, 22 goals), 2015–16 (Simon Terodde, 25 goals)
Regionalliga West champions: 1969–70, 1970–71

Youth
 German Under 19 championship
 Champions: 1969
 Runners-up: 2004, 2005
 German Under 17 championship
 Champions: 1985
Under 19 Bundesliga West
 Champions: 2004, 2005

League results

European record

VfL Bochum II

Stadium

Ruhrstadion (also known as the Vonovia Ruhrstadion under a sponsorship deal) was one of the first modern football-only stadiums in Germany. It was built in the 1970s on the traditional ground of TuS Bochum 08 at the Castroper Straße, north of the city centre.

The fully roofed venue's capacity is 27,599, including standing room for 12,025.

Coaches

Current staff

Coaches

References

External links

The Abseits Guide to German Soccer
fussball.com
vfl-bochum.pl

 
Football clubs in Germany
Football clubs in North Rhine-Westphalia
1848 establishments in Germany
Sports clubs established in 1848
Bundesliga clubs
2. Bundesliga clubs